Kvardal (Aghul: Курдал) is a rural locality (a selo) in Gelkhensky Selsoviet, Kurakhsky District, Republic of Dagestan, Russia. The population was 184 as of 2010.

Geography 
Kvardal is located 25 km northwest of Kurakh (the district's administrative centre) by road. Usug and Gelkhen are the nearest rural localities.

Nationalities 
Aghul people live there.

References 

Rural localities in Kurakhsky District